The European qualification for the 2004 Men's Olympic Volleyball Tournament was held from 7 September 2003 to 10 January 2004.

Elimination round
Dates: 7–21 September 2003
All times are local.
In case of an aggregate set tie, teams compare an aggregate point to determine the winner.

|}

1 Estonia won 133–130 on the aggregate point.

First leg

|}

Second leg

|}

Pre–qualification tournament
Host:  Kuopio, Finland
Dates: 19–23 November 2003
All times are Eastern European Time (UTC+02:00).

Preliminary round

Pool A

|}

|}

Pool B

|}

|}

Final round

Semifinals

|}

Final

|}

Final standing

Qualification tournament
Venue:  Arena Leipzig, Leipzig, Germany
Dates: 5–10 January 2004
All times are Central European Time (UTC+01:00).

Preliminary round

Pool A

|}

|}

Pool B

|}

|}

Final round

Semifinals

|}

Final

|}

Final standing
{| class="wikitable" style="text-align:center;"
|-
!width=40|Rank
!width=180|Team
|- bgcolor=#ccffcc
|1
|style="text-align:left;"|
|-
|2
|style="text-align:left;"|
|-
|rowspan=2|3
|style="text-align:left;"|
|-
|style="text-align:left;"|
|-
|rowspan=2|5
|style="text-align:left;"|
|-
|style="text-align:left;"|
|-
|rowspan=2|7
|style="text-align:left;"|
|-
|style="text-align:left;"|
|}

External links
Official website

Volleyball Men Europe
Olympic Qualification Men Europe
Olympic Qualification Men Europe